Song Sang-hyeon (1551 – 23 May 1592) was a civil minister, writer, and general during the Joseon dynasty. He was the prefect of Dongnae during the Siege of Dongnae, one of the first battles of the Imjin War. He led troops against Japanese general Konishi Yukinaga and was defeated. When presented with demands of surrender, Song famously declined and was captured alive and subsequently killed. His pen name was Cheongok, his courtesy name was Deokgu, and his posthumous name was Chungnyeol.

Early life 
Song Sang-yeon was born to Saheonbu Song Bok-heung (宋復興) and his wife, a descendant of Lee Mun-gun (李文健), writer of the Mukjae Diaries. Known to be a gifted child, Song is said to have mastered the Confucian classics (經史) during his teens. At fifteen years old, he took Seungbosi, the preliminary Sungkyunkwan admission exam, and won first place. It was during this time that Song became friends with eminent future Joseon scholar and politician Gim Jangsaeng. In 1570, he passed the higher Sungkyunkwan admission exam, Jinsasi, and became a Jinsa.

Legacy 
After his death, the Chungnyeolsa Shrine was built in his memory on 1608 by Yun Hwon, the governor of Dongnae.

References

People of the Japanese invasions of Korea (1592–1598)
Joseon scholar-officials
Korean generals
1551 births
1592 deaths
Yeosan Song clan